This is a list of the National Register of Historic Places listings in Lavaca County, Texas.

This is intended to be a complete list of properties listed on the National Register of Historic Places in Lavaca County, Texas. There are nine properties listed on the National Register in the county. One property is a State Antiquities Landmark while two others are Recorded Texas Historic Landmarks.

Current listings

The locations of National Register properties may be seen in a mapping service provided.

|}

See also

National Register of Historic Places listings in Texas
Recorded Texas Historic Landmarks in Lavaca County

References

External links

Lavaca County, Texas
Lavaca County
Buildings and structures in Lavaca County, Texas